The Tree Farm, or Tree Farm Building is a six-story building in Portland, Oregon's Buckman neighborhood, in the United States.

Description and history
Located at Morrison and Southeast Third, the building was designed by Brett Schulz Architects; Guerrilla Development and Pro-Teck Construction served as developer and contractor, respectively. More than 50 strawberry trees are installed on the building's exterior. The project reportedly cost $12.7 million.

References

External links

 Tree Farm at Guerrilla Development

Buckman, Portland, Oregon
Buildings and structures in Portland, Oregon